Ballia is a village in Siwan district of Bihar state in northern India.

Location
It is situated 17 km away from Siwan district. Its coordinates are 26°17'37"N and 84°58'48"E.

Neighboring villages
 Afrad
 Chandpur
 Kanpura
 Gaur
 Madhopur
kalyanpur

Speciality
This village is situated on the bank of distributary of river Gandak. People of different religions, celebrate their specific festivals, but Gadh Mela is famous festival to be celebrated here.

Villages in Siwan district